Selinum is a Eurasiatic genus of flowering plants in the parsley family Apiaceae.

Species
, Plants of the World Online accepted the following species:
Selinum alatum (M.Bieb.) Poir.
Selinum broteroi Hoffmanns. & Link
Selinum carvifolia (L.) L. – Cambridge milk-parsley or little-leaf angelica
Selinum coniifolium (Boiss.) Leute
Selinum cryptotaenium H.Boissieu
Selinum filicifolium (Edgew.) Nasir
Selinum longicalycium M.L.Sheh
Selinum pauciradium (Sommier & Levier) Leute
Selinum physospermifolium (Albov) Hand
Selinum rhodopetalum (Pimenov & Kljuykov) Hand
Selinum vaginatum (Edgew.) C.B.Clarke

Species formerly placed in the genus include:
Selinum wallichianum – synonym of Ligusticopsis wallichiana
Selinum tenuifolium – another synonym of Ligusticopsis wallichiana

Folk-medicinal and ritual uses
Several Himalayan species belonging to the genus are both taken internally and burnt as dhoop or incense as sedatives to soothe mental turmoil of various kinds in Tantric rituals. Given that aphrodisiac properties are also reported they may also be used in practices related to sex magic / sacred sexuality. They are aromatic and mildly psychoactive without being unduly toxic - some species are recorded as having been used both as human food and cattle fodder.

Notes

References

 Biolib
 Plants Database

Apioideae
Apioideae genera